Painting the Clouds with Sunshine is a Technicolor musical film released in 1951, directed by David Butler and starring Dennis Morgan and Virginia Mayo (whose singing voice was dubbed by Bonnie Lou Williams). The film is a musical adaptation of the 1919 play The Gold Diggers by Avery Hopwood. It is the fourth film adaptation of the play, after The Gold Diggers (1923), Gold Diggers of Broadway (1929) and Gold Diggers of 1933 (1933). The film is a jukebox musical, featuring popular songs from the 1910s to 1930s, including two songs from Gold Diggers of Broadway ("Painting the Clouds with Sunshine" and "Tiptoe Through the Tulips") and one song from Gold Diggers of 1933 ("We're in the Money").

Plot
Three smart Las Vegas theatrical girls decide to look for husbands; – Carol, who thinks a millionaire would be good, Abby, who is in love with baritone Vince Nichols, but is perturbed because he gambles, and June, who has a crush on Ted Lansing, a dancer. Ted, however, is in love with Abby.

Cast
 Dennis Morgan as Vince Nichols 
 Virginia Mayo as Carol 
 Gene Nelson as Thedore (Ted) Lansing 
 Lucille Norman as Abby 
 S.Z. Sakall as Felix 'Uncle Felix' Hoff 
 Virginia Gibson as June 
 Tom Conway as Bennington Lansing aka Uncle Benny 
 Wallace Ford as Sam Parks

Songs
 "Painting the Clouds with Sunshine" and "Tiptoe Through the Tulips", music and lyrics by Joe Burke and Al Dubin
 Sung by Dennis Morgan and Lucille Norman
 "Man Is a Necessary Evil" and "The Mambo Man", music by Sonny Burke, lyrics by Jack Elliott
 "Vienna Dreams", music by Rudolf Sieczynski, lyrics by Irving Caesar
 "We're in the Money", music and lyrics by Harry Warren and Al Dubin
 "When Irish Eyes Are Smiling", music and lyrics by Ernest R. Ball, Chauncey Olcott and George Graff Jr.
 "With a Song in My Heart", music by Richard Rodgers, lyrics by Lorenz Hart
 "The Birth of the Blues", music and lyrics by Ray Henderson, B. G. DeSylva and Lew Brown
 "You're My Everything", music and lyrics by Harry Warren, Mort Dixon and Joe Young
 "Jalousie 'Tango Tzigane'", music and lyrics by Jacob Gade and Vera Bloom
 "I Like the Mountain Music", music and lyrics by Frank Weldon and James Cavanaugh

Criticism
"Laborious plot, conventional climax – but good dances and leg-art."

References

External links
 
 
 

1951 films
1951 musical films
Films directed by David Butler
Remakes of American films
Warner Bros. films
American musical films
Jukebox musical films
1950s English-language films
1950s American films